The War in Eastern Europe is a book that describes John Reed's second trip after the first World War broke out.

References 
 
 
 

1916 non-fiction books